ATP synthase subunit s-like protein is a protein that in humans is encoded by the ATP5SL  gene.

References

External links

Further reading